A320 usually refers to the Airbus A320 family of short- to medium-range commercial passenger airliners manufactured by Airbus.

A320 may also refer to:
 "A320" (song) by the Foo Fighters, from the 1998 soundtrack of Godzilla
 A320 Airbus (video game), a 1991 flight simulator computer game
 A320 road (Great Britain)
 Dingoo A320, a micro-sized gaming handheld that supports music and video playback and open game development
 the A320 chipset for AMD's Socket AM4 microprocessor platform